Events in the year 1894 in music.

Specific locations
1894 in Norwegian music

Events 
 March 14 – Johan Svendsen conducts the world premiere of Carl Nielsen's Symphony No. 1 in Copenhagen.
 April 19 – Jules Massenet's opera "Werther" is staged in New York City.
 September 22 – Opening of the Teatro Lirico Internazionale in Milan.
 December 22 – Claude Debussy's Prélude à l'après-midi d'un faune is premiered in Paris
 Enrico Caruso makes his operatic debut.
 The National College of Music, London, was formed by the Moss Family. The college still exists today as an examination board for music and drama.
 George H. Thomas develops the first illustrated song to promote The Little Lost Child, which goes on to sell more than two million copies of its sheet music nationwide.

Published popular music 

 "Airy, Fairy Lillian" w. Tony Raymond m. Maurice Levi
 "And Her Golden Hair Was Hanging Down Her Back" w. Monroe H. Rosenfeld m. Felix McGlennon
 "At Trinity Church I Met My Doom" w.m. Fred Gilbert
 "Don't Be Cross" by Karl Zeller from the operetta Der Obersteiger
 "Forgotten" w. Flora Wulschner m. Eugene Cowles
 "He's Got To Keep A-Movin'" w.m. T. W. Connor
 "His Last Thoughts Were Of You" w. Edward B. Marks m. Joseph W. Stern
 "The Honeymoon" m. George Rosey
 "I Don't Want To Play In Your Yard" w. Philip Wingate m. Henry W. Petrie
 "If It Wasn't For The 'Ouses In Between" w. Edgar Bateman m. George Le Brunn
 "I'll Be True To My Honey Boy" w.m. George Evans
 "I've Been Working on the Railroad" w.m. trad (first copyright 1894)
 "I Can't Change It!" w.m. T.W. Connor
 "Kathleen" w.m. Helene Mora
 "Little Kinkies" w.m. M. Tobias
 "The Little Lost Child" w. Edward B. Marks m. Joseph W. Stern
 "Long Ago In Alcala" w. Frederick Edward Weatherley & Adrian Ross m. André Messager
 "My Friend The Major" w.m. E. W. Rogers
 "My Pearl Is A Bowery Girl" w. William Jerome m. Andrew Mack
 "Oh! That Gorgonzola Cheese" w. Fred W. Leigh m. Harry Champion
 "The Owls Serenade" w. Arthur J. Lamb, m. H.W. Petrie
 "She Is More To Be Pitied Than Censured" w.m. William B. Gray
 "She May Have Seen Better Days" w.m. James Thornton
 "The Sidewalks of New York" w.m. Charles B. Lawlor & James W. Blake
 "Why Did Nellie Leave Home?" by George M. Cohan
 "Yale Society Two-Step" by C. VanBaar
 "You've Been A Good Old Wagon But You've Done Broke Down" by Ben Harney

Recorded popular music 

 "And Her Golden Hair was Hanging Down Her Back" – Dan W. Quinn (Berliner Records)
 "Daisy Bell" – Edward M. Favor (Edison Records) 
 "Keep Movin'" – Standard Quartette (Columbia Records) 
 "The Liberty Bell (march)" – United States Marine Band (Columbia Records) 
 ”Marc Anthony's Curse” - David C. Bangs (Berliner Records) 
 "My Pearl is a Bowery Girl"  – Dan W. Quinn (Berliner Records)
 "The Black Knights Templar" – George J. Gaskin (Berliner Records)
 ”The Sword of Bunker Hill” – Samuel Ross (Berliner Records)
 ”The Village Blacksmith” – David C. Bangs (Berliner Records)
 "Yankee Doodle" – Vess Ossman (Edison Records)

Classical music 
 Anton Arensky – Piano Trio No. 1 in D minor, Op. 32
 Agathe Backer-Grøndahl 
 Norske Folkeviser og Folkedanse, Op.33
 Norwegian Folk Songs, Op.34
 3 Claverstykker, Op.35
 Johannes Brahms – Two Clarinet Sonatas, Op. 120
 Claude Debussy 
 Prélude à l'après-midi d'un faune
 Proses lyriques
 Antonín Dvořák
 Biblical Songs, Op.99
 Humoresques (Dvořák) Op. 101 (B. 187) for piano
 American Suite for piano (orchestrated a year later)
 Robert Fuchs – Serenade No. 5 in D, Op. 53
 Alexander Gretchaninov – String Quartet no 1 (2?) in G major, Op. 2
 Edvard Grieg 
 5 Songs of Norway, Op.58
 5 Songs, Op.60
 Victor Herbert – Concerto for Cello no 2 in E minor
 Mikhail Ippolitov-Ivanov – Caucasian Sketches
 Joseph Jongen – Quartet for Strings no 1 in C minor, op. 3
 August Klughardt – String Quintet, Op.62
 Alexander Kopylov – String Quartet no 2 in F major, op. 23 
 Theodor Leschetizky – 2 Pieces, Op.43
 Gustav Mahler – Symphony No. 2
 Carl Nielsen
 Symphony No. 1 in G minor
 Snefrid, CNW 4
 Symfonisk Suite for piano, FS 19
 Josef Rheinberger – Sonata for Horn and Piano in E-flat major
 Nikolay Rimsky-Korsakov – 2 Pieces, Op.38
 Adolphe Samuel – Symphony No. 7 Opus 48
 Alexander Scriabin – 12 Études, Op. 8
 Charles Villiers Stanford – 6 Elizabethan Pastorals, Op.53
 Wilhelm Stenhammar 
 Piano Concerto No.1, Op.1, premiered March 17 in Stockholm
 String Quartet No. 1 in C major, Op. 2
 Sigismond Stojowski – 2 Orientales, Op.10
 Louis Vierne – String Quartet in D minor, Op. 12 (c. 1894)

Opera 
 Granville Bantock – The Pearl of Iran
 Julius Bechgaard – Frau Inge
 Herman Bemberg – Cleopatra
 Frederick Delius – The Magic Fountain
 Charles-Édouard Lefebvre – Djelma premiered on May 25 at the Théâtre de l'Opéra in Paris
 Hamish MacCunn – Jeanie Deans
 Jules Massenet 
La Navarraise
Le portrait de Manon
Thaïs (opera) 16 March at the Opéra Garnier
 Emile Pessard – Le muet
 Emil Nikolaus von Reznicek – Donna Diana
 Sergei Taneyev – Oresteia (completed 1894, premiered 1895)

Musical theater 
 A Gaiety Girl – Broadway production opened at Daly's Theatre on September 17 and ran for 81 performances
 The Mine Foreman – Austrian production opened at the Theater an der Wien on January 5
 The Passing Show – Broadway production opened at the Casino Theatre on May 5
 Rob Roy, premiered in Detroit on October 1; Broadway production opened at the Herald Square Theatre on October 29 and ran for 168 performances
 The Shop Girl – London production opened at the Gaiety Theatre on November 24 and ran for 546 performances
 A Trip To Chinatown – London production opened at Toole's Theatre on September 29 and ran for 125 performances

Births 
 January 31 – Isham Jones, American bandleader and composer (d. 1956)
 February 11 – Alfonso Leng, Chilean dentist and part-time classical composer (d. 1974)
 February 20 – Jimmy Yancey, American jazz pianist
 April 3 – Dooley Wilson, African American pianist and singer (d. 1953)
 April 15 – Bessie Smith, African American blues singer (d. 1937)
 April 27 – Nicolas Slonimsky, Russian-born American conductor and composer (d. 1995)
 May 10 – Dimitri Tiomkin, Russian-born American film music composer, pianist and conductor (d. 1979)
 May 29 – Beatrice Lillie, Canadian actress and singer (d. 1989)
 June 1 – Percival Mackey, English pianist, film music composer and bandleader (d. 1950)
 June 4 – La Bolduc (Mary Travers), Québécois singer (d. 1941)
 June 10 – Punch Miller, American Dixieland jazz trumpeter (d. 1971)
 July 10 – Jimmy McHugh, American songwriter and pianist (d. 1969)
 August 15 – Harry Akst, American songwriter and pianist (d. 1963)
 August 26 – Arthur Loesser, pianist and musicologist (died 1969)
 September 3 – Marie Dubas, French music-hall singer  (d. 1972)
 September 18 – Willard Robison, American songwriter and bandleader (d. 1968)
 September 25 – J. Mayo Williams, African American blues music producer (d. 1980)
 September 26 – Vaughn De Leath, American crooner, "The Original Radio Girl" (d. 1943)
 December 31 – Ernest John Moeran, British composer (d. 1950)

Deaths 
 January 13 – Nadezhda von Meck, patron of Tchaikovsky (b. 1831)
 January 21 – Guillaume Lekeu, composer (b. 1870) (typhoid)
 January 24 - Laura Schirmer Mapleson, American opera singer (b. 1862)
 January 30 – Giovanni Masutto, Italian musicologist and flautist (b. 1830) 
 February 4
 Louis Lewandowski, composer (b. 1821)
 Adolphe Sax, Belgian instrument maker, inventor of the saxophone (b. 1814)
 February 11 – Emilio Arrieta, composer (b. 1823)
 February 12 – Hans von Bülow, pianist, conductor and composer (b. 1830)
 February 18 – Camillo Sivori, violinist and composer (b. 1815)
 March 21 – Jakob Rosenhain, pianist and composer (b. 1813)
 April 12 – Ludwig Pfau, lyricist and revolutionary (born 1821)
 April 13
 Marie Carandini, opera singer (b. 1826)
 Philipp Spitta, musicologist and biographer of Bach (b. 1841)
June 5 – Marcelina Czartoryska, pianist and aristocrat (born 1817)
 June 9 – Juventino Rosas, violinist and composer (b. 1868)
 June 23 – Marietta Alboni, operatic contralto (b. 1826)
 July 17 – Leconte de Lisle, lyricist (born 1818)
 July 26 – Eduard Tauwitz, composer (b. 1812)
 September 13 – Emmanuel Chabrier, composer (b. 1841)
 September 21 – Emma Fursch-Madi, operatic soprano (b. 1847)
 October 16 – Johanna Jachmann-Wagner, opera singer, actress and music teacher (b. 1826)
 October 27 – Carl Ploug, Danish lyricist, song writer, editor, and politician (born 1813)
 October 28 – Rudolf Hildebrand, historian of the German folk song (b. 1824)
 November 4 – Eugène Oudin, composer (b. 1858)
 November 20 – Anton Rubinstein, pianist and composer (b. 1829)

See also

Notes 

 
1890s in music
19th century in music
Music by year